1958 Chandra is a dark background asteroid from the outer region of the asteroid belt, approximately  in diameter. It was discovered on 24 September 1970, by Argentinian astronomer Carlos Cesco at the Yale–Columbia Southern Station of the Leoncito Astronomical Complex in San Juan, Argentina (also see Félix Aguilar Observatory). It was named after astrophysicist Subrahmanyan Chandrasekhar.

Orbit and classification 

Chandra is a dark C-type asteroid that orbits the Sun in the outer main-belt at a distance of 2.6–3.6 AU once every 5 years and 6 months (1,997 days). Its orbit has an eccentricity of 0.17 and an inclination of 11° with respect to the ecliptic. The body's observation arc begins 16 years prior to its official discovery observation with a precovery taken at Palomar Observatory in 1954.

Naming 

This minor planet was named in honor of Subrahmanyan Chandrasekhar (1910–1995), the Nobel Prize winning Indian–American theoretical astrophysicist (also see Chandrasekhar limit). The approved naming citation was published by the Minor Planet Center on 1 November 1979.

Physical characteristics

Photometry 

In December 2010, a rotational lightcurve was obtained for this asteroid from photometric observations at the U.S. Palomar Transient Factory, California. It gave a rotation period of  hours with a brightness variation of 0.35 magnitude. A second lightcurve, obtained by Italian amateur astronomer Silvano Casulli in August 2014, gave a concurring period of  hours with an amplitude of 0.38 in magnitude.

Diameter and albedo 

According to the survey carried out by the NEOWISE mission of NASA's Wide-field Infrared Survey Explorer, the asteroid measures 36.2 kilometers in diameter and its surface has an albedo of 0.07, while the Collaborative Asteroid Lightcurve Link derives an albedo of 0.05 and a diameter of 33.8 kilometers with an absolute magnitude of 11.2.

References

External links 
 Asteroid Lightcurve Database (LCDB), query form (info )
 Dictionary of Minor Planet Names, Google books
 Asteroids and comets rotation curves, CdR – Observatoire de Genève, Raoul Behrend
 Discovery Circumstances: Numbered Minor Planets (1)-(5000) – Minor Planet Center
 
 

001958
Discoveries by Carlos Ulrrico Cesco
Named minor planets
19700924